The Solothurn S18-1000 20 mm was a Swiss anti-tank rifle used during the Second World War.  It was a variant of the earlier S-18/100 with modifications for a higher muzzle velocity, as well as a larger cartridge size. The more powerful ammunition resulted in significant recoil, which was problematic for the gunner, and its size made portability difficult.

History

The Solothurn firearms company was owned by the German firm Rheinmetall, who used the Swiss company to manufacture arms which were prohibited for manufacture by any German firm under arms limitations imposed at the end of the First World War.

In 1940–1941 the US Army considered adopting the Solothurn S18-1000. The weapon was standardized for limited procurement as 20mm automatic gun T3. In spring 1941 the Solothurn was tested against the Colt .90-cal. (23mm) T4 automatic gun, an aircraft gun. Although not as powerful, the Solothurn was less bulky and complicated and was found more suitable for army use. The plans were to acquire 50 pieces, and later to produce the weapon in the US. However, long contract negotiations resulted in abandonment of the purchase.

It was adopted by the Royal Italian Army in 1940, when a first batch was bought from Switzerland; initially known as Carabina "S" (S carbine), from 1942 it was designated as Fucile anticarro "S" (S anti-tank rifle); employed primarily on vehicles and L3-tankettes given its size and weight, it was largely employed in North Africa; after the 8 September 1943 it was also used by the National Republican Army of the Italian Social Republic.

Specifications
Overall length: S18-1000 and −1100 . This could vary due to a number of optional muzzle brakes used for different projectile weights.
Barrel length: .
Muzzle brake's length: 1-hole brake, ; 4-hole, ; 5-hole, . The brake adds to the overall length of the barrel when installed.
The brakes are changed depending on the recoil force of the rounds being fired. Lighter projectiles require less recoil reduction from the brake to allow the action to cycle. Therefore, the one-hole brake is used for firing high-explosive projectiles, which are much lighter than the armour-piercing variety. The AP projectiles require the 5-hole brake.
Weight: S18-1000 and −1100  empty with magazine
Cartridge: S18-100 20mmX105B, S18-1000 and −1100 20×138mmB. The B indicates a "belted" round which headspaces on the belt rather than the shoulder, rim or mouth of the case
Caliber: 20.5mm or .818" (bore diameter is larger than the land diameter of 20mm or .78")
Action: Recoil-operated semi-automatic for the S18-100 and S18-1000. The S18-1100 was select-fire recoil-operated.
Magazine capacity: S18-100 5- or 10-round, S18-1000 and −1100 10-round standard, but the weapon could use the 20-round magazines from the Flak 30 anti-aircraft gun.

Users 
 : 1 S-18/1100 in 1942
 : as Fucile anticarro tipo S.
 : as 2cm Panzerabwehrbüchse 785 (i), (h) or (s) (depending if ex-Italian, ex-Dutch or bought from Switzerland)
 : 125 delivered to Royal Netherlands Army and 72 to Royal Netherlands East Indies Army
 : 93 acquired in 1939, as Tankbüchse Solo 40
 : trials by US Army

See also
 L3/35, for the "L3 cc" anti-tank (controcarro) tank destroyer

Notes

References and external links
 Ramon Bill, Waffenfabrik Solothurn, Schweizerische Präzision im Dienste der deutschen Rüstungsindustrie, 2002 by Altes Zeughaus Museum Solothurn.
 Zaloga, Steven J., Brian Delf – US Anti-tank Artillery 1941–45 (2005) Osprey Publishing, .
 

20mm sniper rifles
20 mm artillery
Anti-tank rifles
World War II infantry weapons
Weapons of Switzerland
Rheinmetall
Firearms of Switzerland
Military equipment introduced in the 1930s